Colin Forbes (6 March 1928 – 22 May 2022) was a British graphic designer. He was notable as a head of the graphic design programme at the Central School of Arts and Crafts in London, and as one of the founders of the Pentagram design studio.

Biography 
Colin Forbes was born in London in 1928 to John and Kathleen (Ames) Forbes. From 1945 to 1949, he was enlisted in the British Army and thought he would go into aircraft engineering after enlistment. Instead, he studied at the Central School of Arts and Crafts in London, taking advantage of a veteran grant program, and worked briefly under graphic designer and journalist Herbert Spencer. After graduating, Forbes returned to become Head of Graphic Design at the Central School at the age of 28.

By 1960 Forbes had left teaching for private practice and in 1962 formed Fletcher/Forbes/Gill with Alan Fletcher and Bob Gill. (Gill left the partnership in 1965 and was replaced by Theo Crosby and the firm became Crosby/Fletcher/Forbes). In 1972 Forbes and Fletcher were two of the five founders of Pentagram design studio, which would grow into a well known design studio, with locations in New York, Austin, San Francisco, and Berlin, in addition to London.  In 1978 Forbes established a New York office for Pentagram. Forbes was instrumental in setting up the unusual organizational structure and partnership model for which Pentagram, in addition to its design output and influence, is known.

With his partners at Fletcher/Forbes/Gill and later with partners at Pentagram, Forbes is the co-author of several books on design. He has also written under his sole name. Forbes was a 1991 recipient of the AIGA medal.

Forbes died at his home in Westfield, North Carolina on May 22, 2022, at the age of 94.

Books by Forbes
 Graphic Design: Visual Comparisons (with Alan Fletcher and Bob Gill), Reinhold Publishing, 1964.
 Pentagram: The Work of Five Designers (with Pentagram partners), Lund Humphries, 1972.
 Living by Design (with Pentagram partners), Lund Humphries, 1978.
 Seeing is Believing: Identity Design in the 20th Century, Booth-Clibborn Editions, 1995.
 Better Documents: Pentagram's Guide to Choosing Typefaces and Creating Better Correspondence and Documents, Graphis Press, 2000.

References

1928 births
2022 deaths
Artists from London
Alumni of the Central School of Art and Design
AIGA medalists
British graphic designers
Academics of the Central School of Art and Design
Pentagram partners (past and present)